Jānis Reirs (born 23 September 1961 in Riga) is a Latvian politician who has been serving as Minister of Finance in the government of Prime Minister Arturs Krišjānis Kariņš since 2019. He previously served as Minister for Welfare in the Kučinskis cabinet from 2016 to 2019 and Minister for Finance in the second Straujuma cabinet.

Education
Reirs holds a master's degree in economics from the University of Latvia (LU).

Career
Reirs was active member of Communist party (students’ organization). While progressive part of Latvian nation was talking about declaring independence from USSR, Reirs was still defending ideals of the communism.
Reirs was a Member of the Board of Trasta komercbanka PLC from 1996 to 1999. He chaired the board of JSC Spodrība, a Latvian producer of detergents and maintenance products. He was also a partner at Prudentia, one of Latvia's largest investment banks.

Together with Einars Repše, who later served as Latvia's prime minister from 2002 until 2004, Reirs was one of the founders in 2002 of New Era, which in 2010 merged into the centre-right grouping Unity.

Reirs became a member of the Latvian Parliament in the 2002 national elections and later served as Minister for Information society from 2004 until 2006. From 2010 until 2014 he chaired the Budget Committee.

Reirs participate in parliamentary elections of 2022, however he has rejected, mainly because of his past, and also because of decisions made by him during his service as minister of finance. His name also appears is so called building cartel case.

In 2019, Reirs joined forces with his counterparts of Germany, France, Italy, Spain and the Netherlands in pushing for the establishment of a new EU supervisory authority that would take over the oversight of money laundering at financial firms, which had been the responsibility of member states.

Other activities

European Union organizations
 European Investment Bank (EIB), Ex-Officio Member of the Board of Governors (since 2019)
 European Stability Mechanism (ESM), Member of the Board of Governors (since 2019)

International organizations
 European Bank for Reconstruction and Development (EBRD), Ex-Officio Member of the Board of Governors (since 2019)
 Multilateral Investment Guarantee Agency (MIGA), World Bank Group, Ex-Officio Member of the Board of Governors (since 2019)
 Nordic Investment Bank (NIB), Ex-Officio Member of the Board of Governors
 World Bank, Ex-Officio Member of the Board of Governors (since 2019)

References

1961 births
Living people
Politicians from Riga
New Era Party politicians
New Unity politicians
Ministers of Finance of Latvia
Ministers of Welfare of Latvia
Deputies of the 8th Saeima
Deputies of the 9th Saeima
Deputies of the 10th Saeima
Deputies of the 11th Saeima
Deputies of the 12th Saeima
Deputies of the 13th Saeima
University of Latvia alumni